The Trois-Rivières Saints were a minor league baseball team located in Trois-Rivières, Quebec.  The team played in the Canadian Baseball League.  Their home stadium was Stade Municipal.

References
The Baseball Cube - Trois-Rivières Saints

Sport in Trois-Rivières
Baseball teams in Quebec
Defunct baseball teams in Canada
Defunct independent baseball league teams
Baseball teams disestablished in 2003